Elmet was a county constituency in West Yorkshire represented in the House of Commons of the Parliament of the United Kingdom. It elected one Member of Parliament (MP) by the first past the post system of election.

From 1997 the MP was Colin Burgon of Labour, who did not stand in the 2010 general election.

Boundaries
The City of Leeds wards of Barwick and Kippax, Garforth and Swillington, Wetherby, and Whinmoor.

The constituency was created in 1983 to cover the far eastern wards of Leeds and neighbouring areas, notably Wetherby, Barwick-in-Elmet, Kippax, Garforth and Swillington. It also includes the Whinmoor area of east Leeds. Initially the Boundary Commission for England proposed calling the constituency Leeds East, with the existing Leeds East constituency being renamed Leeds East Central. This was opposed during local enquiries where the seat was instead named for the ancient kingdom of Elmet although it covers a significantly smaller area.  Wetherby and Garforth were the largest settlements in the constituency.

Boundary review
Following their review of parliamentary representations in West Yorkshire, the Boundary Commission for England created a new seat, Elmet and Rothwell, reducing the number of seats in the region by one.

History
The constituency was created in 1983 from parts of the seats of Barkston Ash, Leeds East, and Normanton. Elmet was historically always a marginal seat due to the demographic makeup of the region, in contrast to Barkston Ash which was traditionally Tory.

After the 1983 general election the metropolitan district of the City of Leeds was represented by the constituencies of Elmet, Leeds Central, Leeds East, Leeds North East, Leeds North West, Leeds West, Morley and Leeds South and Pudsey.

Members of Parliament

Elections

Elections in the 1980s

Elections in the 1990s

Elections in the 2000s

See also
List of parliamentary constituencies in West Yorkshire

Notes and references

Constituencies of the Parliament of the United Kingdom established in 1983
Constituencies of the Parliament of the United Kingdom disestablished in 2010
Politics of Leeds
Parliamentary constituencies in Yorkshire and the Humber (historic)